Doctor Who at the BBC Radiophonic Workshop Volume 2: New Beginnings 1970–1980 is the second in a series of compilations of BBC Radiophonic Workshop music from Doctor Who. The album collected various incidental music from the 1970s including, for the first time, the complete Malcolm Clarke score for the 1972 serial The Sea Devils, only the second scored completely by the Radiophonic Workshop. The compilation also featured a few of Dudley Simpson's compositions as realised by Brian Hodgson, some Delia Derbyshire music as featured in Inferno, two Peter Howell demos from 1979 and a selection of Dick Mills' sound effects from the era.

Track listing

External links
Producer's notes
Album information

BBC Radiophonic Workshop albums
Doctor Who soundtracks
2000 compilation albums